Xu Xinrong (born April 1962) is a Chinese politician and the current chairman of the Shaanxi Provincial Committee of the Chinese People's Political Consultative Conference, in office since January 2022. He was a delegate to the 12th National People's Congress. He is a representative of the 19th National Congress of the Chinese Communist Party. He is an alternate member of the 19th Central Committee of the Chinese Communist Party.

Biography
Xu was born in Qian County, Shaanxi, in April 1962. He graduated from Central Party School of the Chinese Communist Party and Shaanxi Normal University. He also received his MBA degree from the Guanghua School of Management, Peking University.

He got involved in politics in August 1983, and joined the Chinese Communist Party (CCP) in June 1984. In January 1995, he was admitted to member of the standing committee of the CCP Qindu District Committee, the district's top authority, and was appointed governor in November 1997. In June 2000, he was promoted to party secretary, the top political position in the district. In March 2004, he became deputy party secretary of Xianyang, but having held the position for only two years. In February 2008, he was named acting mayor of Weinan, succeeding . He was installed as mayor in March. In February 2013, he rose to become party secretary. It would be his first job as "first-in-charge" of a city. He concurrently served as chairman of Weinan People's Congress since February 2014. He was appointed party secretary of Yan'an in June 2015 and was admitted to member of the standing committee of the CCP Shaanxi Provincial Committee, the province's top authority. In January 2021, he was appointed head of the United Front Department of CCP Shaanxi Provincial Committee, concurrently serving as chairman of the Shaanxi Provincial Committee of the Chinese People's Political Consultative Conference since January 2022, the province's top political advisory body.

References

1962 births
Living people
People from Qian County
Central Party School of the Chinese Communist Party alumni
Shaanxi Normal University alumni
Peking University alumni
People's Republic of China politicians from Shaanxi
Chinese Communist Party politicians from Shaanxi
Delegates to the 12th National People's Congress
Alternate members of the 19th Central Committee of the Chinese Communist Party